Eukaryotic initiation factor 4F (eIF4F) is a heterotrimeric protein complex that binds the 5' cap of messenger RNAs (mRNAs) to promote eukaryotic translation initiation. The eIF4F complex is composed of three non-identical subunits: the DEAD-box RNA helicase eIF4A, the cap-binding protein eIF4E, and the large "scaffold" protein eIF4G. The mammalian eIF4F complex was first described in 1983, and has been a major area of study into the molecular mechanisms of cap-dependent translation initiation ever since.

Function 
eIF4F is important for recruiting the small ribosomal subunit (40S) to the 5' cap of mRNAs during cap-dependent translation initiation. Components of the complex are also involved in cap-independent translation initiation; for instance, certain viral proteases cleave eIF4G to remove the eIF4E-binding region, thus inhibiting cap-dependent translation.

Structure 
Structures of eIF4F components have been solved individually and as partial complexes by a variety of methods, but no complete structure of eIF4F is currently available.

Subunits 
In mammals, the eIF4E•G•A trimeric complex can be directly purified from cells, while only the two subunit eIF4E•G can be purified from yeast cells. eIF4E binds the m7G 5' cap and the eIF4G scaffold, connecting the mRNA 5' terminus to a hub of other initiation factors and mRNA. The interaction of eIF4G•A is thought to guide the formation of a single-stranded RNA landing pad for the 43S preinitiation complex (43S PIC) via eIF4A's RNA helicase activity.

The eIF4F proteins interact with a number of different binding partners, and there are multiple genetic isoforms of eIF4A, eIF4E, and eIF4G in the human genome. In mammals, eIF4F is bridged to the 40S ribosomal subunit by eIF3 via eIF4G, while budding yeast lacks this connection. Interactions between eIF4G and PABP are thought to mediate the circularization of mRNA particles.

Approximate molecular weight for human proteins.

In addition to the major proteins encompassing the eIF4F trimer, the eIF4F complex functionally interacts with proteins including eIF4B and eIF4H. The unusual isoform of eIF4G, eIF4G2 or DAP5, also appears to perform a non-canonical translation function.

Regulation 
The eIF4E subunit of eIF4F is an important target of mTOR signaling through the eIF4E binding protein (4E-BP). Phosphorylation of 4E-BPs by mTOR prevents their binding to eIF4E, freeing eIF4E to bind eIF4G and participate in translation initiation.

See also 
Eukaryotic translation
Eukaryotic initiation factor
5' cap

References 

Protein biosynthesis
Molecular biology
Gene expression
Protein complexes
RNA-binding proteins